Winnsboro is a city in Franklin and Wood counties in northeastern Texas, United States, north of Tyler. The population was 3,434 at the 2010 census, down from 3,584 at the 2000 census. Settlement of Winnsboro began in the 1850s with a post office established between 1854 and 1855.

Geography
It is in Northeast Texas.

The city center and about three-quarters of its area are in Wood County, with the remainder in Franklin County.

Texas State Highway 11 passes through the city as Broadway Street, leading east  to Pittsburg and northwest  to Sulphur Springs. Highway 37 (Main Street) crosses Highway 11 in the center of town, leading north  to Mount Vernon and southwest  to Mineola.

Climate
The climate in this area is characterized by hot, humid summers and generally mild to cool winters.  According to the Köppen climate classification system, Winnsboro has a humid subtropical climate, Cfa on climate maps.

Demographics

As of the 2020 United States census, there were 3,455 people, 1,083 households, and 677 families residing in the city.

As of the census of 2010, there were 3,584 people, 1,300 households, and 813 families residing in the city. The population density was 973.9 people per square mile (376.0/km). There were 1,491 housing units at an average density of 405.1 per square mile (156.4/km). The racial makeup of the city was 85.71% White, 8.90% African American, 0.75% Native American, 0.64% Asian, 0.11% Pacific Islander, 2.73% from other races, and 1.14% from two or more races. Hispanic or Latino of any race were 4.8% of the population.

There were 1,300 households, out of which 26.5% had children under the age of 18 living with them, 46.9% were married couples living together, 11.8% had a female householder with no husband present, and 37.4% were non-families. 34.8% of all households were made up of individuals, and 23.4% had someone living alone who was 65 years of age or older. The average household size was 2.26 and the average family size was 2.91.

In the city, the population was spread out, with 19.9% under the age of 18, 10.8% from 18 to 24, 26.5% from 25 to 44, 18.6% from 45 to 64, and 24.2% who were 65 years of age or older. The median age was 39 years. For every 100 females, there were 108.1 males. For every 100 females age 18 and over, there were 109.6 males.

The median income for a household in the city was $25,690, and the median income for a family was $37,286. Males had a median income of $25,972 versus $18,036 for females. The per capita income for the city was $15,612. About 11.3% of families and 14.7% of the population were below the poverty line, including 16.6% of those under age 18 and 15.3% of those age 65 or over.

Education
The city is served by the Winnsboro Independent School District.

Library
Gilbreath Memorial Library is located at 916 N. Main Street. The library is a public Tri-County library serving Franklin, Hopkins, and Wood counties.

Media
The city is served by the newspaper Winnsboro News.

See also

 List of cities in Texas

References

External links

 
 Winnsboro Chamber of Commerce

Cities in Franklin County, Texas
Cities in Texas
Cities in Wood County, Texas
Populated places established in 1855
1855 establishments in Texas